Iniyum Kadha Thudarum is a 1985 Indian Malayalam-language film, directed by Joshiy and produced by Poorna Chandra Rao. The film stars Mammootty, Thilakan, Jaya Prada, Ambika and Baby Shalini. The film has musical score by Shyam.

Plot 
Raveendran is an honest customs officer, who lost his mother at a very young age and his abandoned by his father. Chacko, his teacher, had brought him up providing all education. Due to circumstances, Raveendran falls in love with Nimmi, who is a college student. Despite her father opposing their relationship, she elopes and marries Raveendran and leads a good married life. Even after they are blessed with a daughter, Nimmi's father still shows no attachment towards them.

Businessman Alexander has a good image in front of the public, but he along with his three sons is engaged in illegal activities, importing goods illegally, evading customs. Raveendran arrests a group engaged with illegal activities, and later discovered that one among them is the son-in-law of his dearest teacher Chacko. The culprit, being a Muslim had eloped with Chacko's daughter Mary, and was engaged in illegal trading activities owing to lack of employment. Though Mary was not willing to accept any financial aid, Raveendran then shares a part of his income with Mary who is now alone, by handing it to the shopkeeper, who is aiding Mary.

Raveendran finds that Alexander is involved in illegal activities, and raids his warehouse to find maps related to India, which leads him to conclude that Alexander is involved in treason. Just before getting orders for arresting Alexander, Alexander offers money to Raveendran, which he refuses. Alexander's hired goons then fight Raveendran; however, Raveendran overpowers all of them. When Raveendran reaches home, he is arrested for murdering Alexander and is imprisoned for nine years.

In the meantime, Nimmi and his daughter are asked to leave the government guest house and they stay with Mary. As life becomes difficult, Mary goes to her hometown to get her family share. Alexander's three sons broke into Mary's house that night and brutally rape Nimmi and murder her daughter. Grief-stricken, Nimmi kills herself. Raveendran is brought out from jail to perform the last rituals for them.

Nine years later, his punishment has been completed and Raveendran is released from jail. He is still looking for an answer to why Nimmi committed suicide, and meets the old shopkeeper, who tells him that people saw Alexander's sons breaking into Mary's house that night. He also hands the suicide note that he had kept safe. Though Raveendran is advised to lead a peaceful life elsewhere, Raveendran wants to take revenge for the death of his wife and daughter.

He kills Alexander's two sons one by one. When he is about to kill the third son in a hotel room, he is surprised to see Alexander along with him there. At gunpoint, Alexander confesses that it was their servant who was killed years ago, which was then faked to be Alexander's death. Raveendran kills Alexander's son and follows Alexander who runs for his life, into a courtroom, where proceedings were going on, and kills Alexander in front of the judge. The judge orders police to arrest Raveendran, to which Raveendran proclaims that he was already arrested and punished for killing the same person years ago, and how can he be arrested for killing the same person twice?

Cast
Mammootty as Raveendran
Thilakan as Alexander
Jaya Prada as Nirmala Menon/Nimmi
Nedumudi Venu as Moidu
M. G. Soman as Krishnan, Nimmi's father
T. P. Madhavan
Ambika as Mary
Santhosh as Sandeep
Baby Shalini
Innocent
Kunchan
Captain Raju
Lalu Alex
Paravoor Bharathan
Prathapachandran as Judge

Soundtrack
The music was composed by Shyam and the lyrics were written by Poovachal Khader.

References

External links
 

1985 films
1980s Malayalam-language films
Films directed by Joshiy